= Eloi El =

Rwandan music artist

Eloi Muhoranimana (born May 27, 1999), commonly known for his stage name "Eloi El" is a Rwandan music artist, songwriter and producer.

Eloi is specialized in deep house music which is a sub-genre of Electronic Dance Music (EDM). Eloi has released more than 10 singles & collaborations such as: Magical, Voices, Without you, The Way You Love Me.

Eloi released an Extended Play-EP titled “Africa to the World”, which emerged as the top streamed among his released EPs.

== Early life and music career ==
Eloi derives inspiration from his family, being born and raised in a family of musicians, including his father who was a member of Orchestra Irangira, his two brothers: Sean Brizz, Christian Iradukunda known as "Chris Cheetah" who produced various musical tracks in Rwanda.
